Ryū Mitsuse ( Mitsuse Ryū, March 18, 1928 - July 7, 1999) was a Japanese novelist, science fiction writer, alternate history writer, historical novelist, and essayist. Mitsuse is the author of Hyakuoku no Hiru to Sen'oku no Yoru. Among his various works, this SF novel is considered as his representative work. Mitsuse is a founder member and was a member of the SFWJ (Science Fiction and Fantasy Writers of Japan). In the West he might be best known for manga-related works and the story The Sunset, 2217 A.D. which appeared in Frederik Pohl's "Best Science Fiction for 1972".

Biography

Birth and Age of student 
Mitsuse was born at Minami-Senju, Kita-Toshima District, Tokyo Prefecture in 1928. His birth name was Kimio Chiba. The eldest son of Kizō Chiba and Kiyo. There were three elder sisters.

In around June, 1945, he evacuated to Iwate prefecture, which was his parents' homeland, from Tokyo. He transferred to kyūsei Ichinose middle school. In 1948, he graduated from this middle school and entered the Toyo University in Tokyo. But he dropped out, and entered the Meiji University. But he again dropped out in short period. He transferred to Kawamura high school and graduated from this school. In 1949, Mitsuse entered the department of Agriculture of the Tokyo University of Education. In 1950, he transferred to the department of Science, zoology course, and graduated from this university in 1953.

In 1954, Mitsuse again entered the department of literature, philosophy course, in Tokyo University of Education, which he did not graduate from. During this period in Tokyo, he was engaging in literary coterie activities.

Marriage 
In 1955, Mitsuse proposed marriage to Chitose Iizuka, but her father opposed this proposal and rejected their marriage. Mitsuse could not marry. In 1957, Mitsuse became a tutor of Koganai high school of Tokyo prefecture. And next year, he obtained a stable job as a high school teacher of biology and earth science.

In 1959, Mitsuse again proposed marriage. He talked to the father of Chitose that he would take the "surname Iizuka". Thus he was allowed to marry with Chitose, and Mitsuse became Kimio Iizuka.

Becoming a novelist 
Before his marriage, Mitsuse joined "Kagaku Sōsaku Club" where Takumi Shibano was operating as a publisher and an editor of the coterie magazine "Uchū-jin" in 1957. He started publishing various short novels in  under the pen-name Mitsuse Ryū. He published first long novel "Hakengun Kaeru" in Uchūjin. (continued)

As an SF novelist, he created the Space Chronicles series. His early long SF novel Tasogare ni Kaeru belongs to this series. Most of his short SF stories constitute this series. Rakuyō 2217 nen (The Sunset, 2217 A.D.) is one of these stories.

Works 
In Japanese science fiction he might be better known for the novel , which combines interest in technology and the Buddha.  It was ranked the top of the Japanese SF novels in a 2006 poll by the SF Magazine.  Ten Billion Days and a Hundred Billion Nights was adapted into a manga by Moto Hagio in the late 1970s.

Long Novels 
 Tasogare ni Kaeru 1964, Hayakawa Publishing
 Hyakuoku no Hiru to Sen'oku no Yoru 1967, Hayakawa Publishing
 English translation: Ten Billion Days and One Hundred Billion Nights, 2011, Haikasoru.
 Kan'ei Mumyōken 1969, Rippu Shobo
 Ushinawareta Toshi no Kiroku 1972, Hayakawa Publishing
 Seitō Totoku-fu 1975, Hayakawa Publishing
 Hiden Miyamoto Musashi 1976, Yomiuri Shinbunsha
 Higashi Canal Bunsho 1977, Hayakawa Publishing
 Karera, Atlantis yori 1979, Rippu Shobo
 Uchū Kōro 1980, Kiso Tengaisha
 Gen'ei no Ballad 1980, Tokuma Shoten
 Karera Seiun yori 1981, Tokuma Shoten
 Shin Miyamoto Musashi 1981, Tokuma Shoten
 Tokoro wa Izuko, Suishi-ei 1983, Kadokawa Shoten
 Heike Monogatari 1983 - 1988, Kadokawa Shoten
 Fubuki no Niji 1984, Shueisha
 Aurora no Kienu Ma ni 1984, Hayakawa Publishing
 New York, Yōsoro 1984, Kadokawa Shoten
 Sabita Ginga 1987, Hayakawa Publishing
 Miyamoto Musashi Kessen-Roku 1992, Kofusha Shuppan
 Yamiichi no Shinkirō 1993, Jitsugyo no Nihonsha
 Hidedyoshi to Nobunaga - Shisetsu Shinchō-kō-Ki 1996, Kofusha Shuppan
 Ihon Saiyūki 1999, Kadokawa Haruki Jimusho

Space Chronicle series

Short novels 
 City 0 nen
 Solomon 1942 nen
 Hare no Umi 1979 nen
 Bohimei 2007 nen
 Hyōmu 2015 nen
 Okhotsk 2017 nen
 Pilot Farm 2029 nen
 Kansen Suiro 2061 nen
 Uchū Kyūjotai 2180 nen
 Hyōi-Sei 2197 nen
 Junshisen 2205 nen
 Ryūsa 2210 nen
 Rakuyō 2217 nen
 City 2220 nen
 Senjō 2241 nen
 Soula 2291 nen
 Erutria 2411 nen
 Sincia Yūsuichi 2450 nen
 Ryūsei 2505 nen
 Nishi Canal-Shi 2703 nen
 Renpou 3812 nen
 Cabilia 4016 nen
 Canan 5100 nen
 Henkyō 5320 nen

Long novels 
The following long novels belong to "the Space Chronicle series" 
 Tasogare ni Kaeru 1964, Hayakawa Publishing
 Ushinawareta Toshi no Kiroku 1972, Hayakawa Publishing
 Higashi Canal Bunsho 1977, Hayakawa Publishing
 Sabita Ginga 1987, Hayakawa Publishing

Young adult fictions 
 Yūbae Sakusen 1967, Seikosha
 Asu e no Tsuiseki
 Hokuhoku-tō wo Keikaiseyo 1969, Asahi Sonorama
 Akatsuki wa tada Gin-iro 1970, Asahi Sonorama
 Sono Hana wo Miruna! 1970, Mainichi Shinbunsha
 Sakusen NACL 1971, Iwasaki Shoten
 SOS Time Patrol 1972, Asahi Sonorama
 Tachidomareba Shi 1978, Asahi Sonorama
 Kieta Machi 1978, Tsuru Shobo
 Ijigen Kaikyō 1979, Asahi Sonorama

Essays 
 Ron Sensei no Mushimegane 1976, Hayakawa Publishing
 Ron Sensei no Mushimegane, Part 2 1982, Tokuma Shoten
 Ron Sensei no Mushimegane, Part 3 1983, Tokuma Shoten
 Kotori ga Sukininaru Hon illustration: Masayuki Yabu'uchi 1985, Nature Island sha/ Seiunsha
 Mushi no ii, Mushi no Hanashi Dialogues with Daisaburō Okumoto 1986, Liyonsha
 Rekishi Sozoro Aruki 1989, Tairiku Shobo
 Ushinawareta Bunmei no Kioku 1996, Seishun Shuppansha
 Ushinawareta Jikūkan no Nazo 1998, Seishun Shuppansha

Stories adapted into manga 
 Uchū 2007 nen manga by Kyūta Ishikawa (:ja:石川球太)
 Maboroshi no Yamato manga by Takeshi Koshiro (:ja:古城武司)
 Hyakuoku no Hiru to Sen'oku no Yoru manga by Moto Hagio (:ja:萩尾望都)
 Ron Sensei no Mushimegane manga by Tadashi Katō (:ja:加藤唯史)
 Andromeda Stories author: Ryū Mitsuse, manga by Keiko Takemiya (:ja:竹宮惠子)

Notes and references

References 
  Yume wo nomi,  (2017) 
"Yume wo nomi - Nihon SF no Kinjitō, Mitsuse Ryū" (Only the Dream - Ryū Mitsuse, the Monument of Japanese SF) was originally published in S-F magazine from February 2012 to October 2013 issues. Having been additionally written and compiled by Yukari Tachikawa, the Biography was published in 2017.
 東雅夫＆石堂藍国書刊行会（2009）
 The Encyclopedia of Science Fiction page 641

External links 

1928 births
1999 deaths
Japanese science fiction writers
Japanese alternate history writers
Japanese historical novelists
20th-century Japanese novelists